Swing Your Partners is a 1918 American short comedy film featuring Harold Lloyd. Copies of the film survive in two collections.

Plot
Harold and Snub are two vagrants who are mistaken for visiting dance experts by the proprietor of Professor Tanglefoot's Dance Academy because of their startling resemblance to them.  Harold teaches a class of female pupils a few interesting and lively dance steps before the real pair of experts arrive.

Cast
 Harold Lloyd
 Snub Pollard
 Bebe Daniels
 William Blaisdell
 Sammy Brooks
 Lige Conley (credited as Lige Cromley)
 William Gillespie
 Bud Jamison

Reception
Like many American films of the time, Swing Your Partners was subject to cuts by city and state film censorship boards. For example, the Chicago Board of Censors required a cut of two near views of Lloyd on a piano stool facing the camera.

See also
 Harold Lloyd filmography

References

External links

1918 films
American silent short films
1918 comedy films
1918 short films
American black-and-white films
Films directed by Alfred J. Goulding
Silent American comedy films
American comedy short films
1910s American films